Kepler-371 (also known as KOI-2194 or KIC 3548044) is a star some 2,720 ly away from the Earth. It hosts a multi planetary system consisting of 2 confirmed Super-Earths, as well as 1 unconfirmed Near-Earth sized exoplanet in its habitable zone.

References 

 
Planetary systems with two confirmed planets
Cygnus (constellation)
Planetary transit variables